Robert Kendrick and Jürgen Melzer were the defending champions but did not participate this year.

Jordan Kerr and Jim Thomas won in the final 6–3, 7–5, against Nathan Healey and Igor Kunitsyn.

Seeds

Draw

Draw

External links
Draw

Doubles